Ivana Vanjak (born 30 May 1995) is a German volleyball player.

Career 
She played for Stanford University.
She participated in the 2018 FIVB Volleyball Women's Nations League.

Clubs 

  VC Wiesbaden (2012–2013)
  Stanford University (2013–2017)
  UFC Münster (2017–2020)
  ASPTT Mulhouse (2020– )

References

External links 
 FIVB profile
 CEV profile

1995 births
Living people
Expatriate volleyball players in the United States
German women's volleyball players
Stanford Cardinal women's volleyball players
Sportspeople from Frankfurt
German people of Croatian descent